Glasshouse Mountains railway station is located on the North Coast line in Queensland, Australia. It serves the town of Glass House Mountains in the Sunshine Coast Region.

History
The station opened in 1890 as Coonowrin (after nearby Mount Coonowrin) and was renamed Glass Mountains in February 1891 and Glass House Mountains in 1914. The official station name was later changed to Glasshouse Mountains, which differs from the Glass House Mountains after which it was named. Platform 1 has a steel shelter, while platform 2 has a wooden structure.

Services
Glasshouse Mountains is serviced by City network services to Brisbane, Nambour and Gympie North. To relieve congestion on the single track North Coast line, the rail service is supplemented by a bus service operated by Kangaroo Bus Lines on weekdays between Caboolture and Nambour as route 649.

Services by platform

Future
The North Coast line from Beerburrum to Landsborough is scheduled to be duplicated by 2021.

References

External links

Glasshouse Mountains station Queensland Rail
Glasshouse Mountains station Queensland's Railways on the Internet

Glass House Mountains, Queensland
North Coast railway line, Queensland
Railway stations in Australia opened in 1891
Railway stations in Sunshine Coast, Queensland